Washington Highway may refer to:

 A183 road (England), called Washington Highway
 U.S. Route 1 in Virginia, called Washington Highway in Hanover County